The Grand Mosque of Mopti, also known as Komoguel Mosque, is a mosque located in the city of Mopti, in the Mopti Region of Mali.

Architecture 
The mosque itself consists of a covered building and a courtyard, as well as a 2-3 meter tall protective wall.  Construction of the mosque began as early as 1908.

World Heritage status 
This site was added to the UNESCO World Heritage Tentative List on March 19, 2009, in the Cultural category.

References

External links 

The Great Mosque at Mopti a project by the Media Center for Art History at Columbia University

Mopti
Mosques in Mali
Sudano-Sahelian architecture